Bruce S. Barry is an American television soap opera director.

Positions held
As the World Turns
 Occasional Director (1979, 1980, 1981)

Guiding Light
 Director (1978- August 16, 2004)

Love of Life
 Associate Director (1977-1978)

Search for Tomorrow
 Associate Director (1977-1978)

Texas
 Occasional Director (1982)

Awards and nominations
Daytime Emmy Award
Nomination, 2005, Directing, As the World Turns
Win, 1994, Directing, Guiding Light
Nomination, 1993, Directing, Guiding Light
Nomination, 1991, Directing, Guiding Light
Nomination, 1990, Directing, Guiding Light
Nomination, 1986, Directing, Guiding Light
Win, 1985, Directing, Guiding Light

Directors Guild of America
Win, 2005, Directing, Guiding Light
Nomination, 2001, Directing, Guiding Light
Nomination, 1997, Directing, Guiding Light
Nomination, 1996, Directing, Guiding Light

References

External links

American television directors
Year of birth missing (living people)
American soap opera writers
Living people
Directors Guild of America Award winners
Daytime Emmy Award winners